Emmanuel Kwabena Kyeremateng Agyarko (10 December 1957 – 21 November 2018) was a Ghanaian politician from the New Patriotic Party (NPP). He served as the Member of Parliament for the Ayawaso West Wuogon Constituency in Accra from 2012 until his death in 2018. The cause of his death, at the Yale–New Haven Hospital, was reportedly acid reflux and a malignant gallbladder infection.

Biography 
He was a pharmacist by training and attended the Kwame Nkrumah University of Science and Technology, where he received an undergraduate degree in pharmacy. His mother was from Krobo Odumase in the Eastern Region of Ghana and his father from Jamasi in the Ashanti Region. He was married and had seven children. He died on Wednesday, 21 November 2018  after a short illness for which he had undergone corrective surgery.

He comes from a political family. His brother, Boakye Agyarko served as the Energy Minister in the first NPP administration of Nana Akuffo Addo and also served as the Chief Executive Officer of the Food and Drugs Board. His sister,  Dedo Difie Agyarko-Kusi, is Ghana's current ambassador to South Korea and a former Parliamentary candidate for Lower Manya Krobo on the ticket of the NPP.

Agyarko was also the Chairperson of the Environment, Science and Technology Committee of Parliament and once served on the Government's Assurance and Health Committees.

References 

1957 births
2018 deaths
Ghanaian MPs 2013–2017
Ghanaian MPs 2017–2021
New Patriotic Party politicians